With Closed Eyes is a 1994 Italian drama film written and directed by Francesca Archibugi. It is based on the novel with the same name written by Federigo Tozzi.

For his performance Marco Messeri won the Nastro d'Argento for best supporting actor.

Cast 
 Debora Caprioglio: Ghisola, adult 
Marco Messeri: Domenico
 Stefania Sandrelli: Anna
 Alessia Fugardi: Ghisola, young age
 Gabriele Bocciarelli: Pietro, young age
 Ángela Molina: Rebecca
 Fabio Modesti: Pietro, adult 
 Sergio Castellitto: Alberto
 Margarita Lozano: Masa
 Laura Betti: Beatrice
 Nada:  singer

References

External links

1994 films
Italian drama films
Films directed by Francesca Archibugi
1994 drama films
1990s Italian-language films
1990s Italian films